Pilea microphylla also known as angeloweed, artillery plant,  joypowder plant or (in Latin America)  brilhantina is an annual plant native to Florida, Mexico, the West Indies, and tropical Central and Southern America. In the southern part of México, specifically Campeche and Mérida, the local name is Frescura. The plant belongs to the family Urticaceae. It has light green, almost succulent, stems and tiny 1/8" leaves which contribute to its other nickname, "Artillery Fern", though it is not related to ferns. It is grown as a ground cover in many areas.

Propagation
Pilea microphylla can be propagated by dividing the root ball, or taking herbaceous cuttings and rooting them with rooting hormone.  The plant enjoys a thorough watering after the soil has been allowed to dry, and misting has been shown to be beneficial. Direct sunlight causes the leaves to turn brown and fall off, so it prefers filtered light.

Invasive species
Pilea microphylla has been introduced to various tropical and subptropical regions around the world. It is considered an invasive species in Australia, China, Diego Garcia, the Galapagos Islands, the Federated States of Micronesia, Fiji, French Polynesia, Guam, Hawaii, India, Indonesia, Japan, Kiribati, Marshall islands, Nauru, New Caledonia, Niue, Palau, Papua New Guinea, the Philippines, Pitcairn Islands, Singapore,  the Solomon Islands, Tonga, and Wallis and Futuna.

Synonyms
 Pilea microphylla var. trianthemoides is a synonym of Pilea trianthemoides

References

microphylla